James William Hope was an English professional footballer who played as an inside forward for Sunderland.

References

People from Kelloe
Footballers from County Durham
English footballers
Association football inside forwards
Kelloe F.C. players
Southmoors Violet F.C. players
Birtley F.C. players
West Stanley F.C. players
Sunderland A.F.C. players
Darlington Town F.C. players
Horden Athletic F.C. players
English Football League players